På vårt sätt is a 2003 cover album by Swedish teen pop group Miio, consisting of recordings of several Swedish pop hits. The album peaked at number 15 on the Swedish Albums Chart.

Track listing
"Hänger utanför din dörr" (Miio feat. Nico) - 3:37 
"När vi två blir en" (Miio feat. Daddy Boastin') - 3:23 
"Vara vänner" - 3:57 
"Kom och värm dig" (Miio feat. Nico) - 3:25 
"Vi ska gömma oss i varandra" - 3:33 
"Fantasi" (Miio feat. Ayo) - 3:02 
"Ska vi gå hem till dig" (Miio feat. Ayo) - 3:19 
"Precis som du" - 4:07 
"Regn hos mig" - 3:07 
"Det hjärta som brinner" - 3:52 
"När alla vännerna gått hem" - 3:34

Charts

References 

2003 albums
Swedish-language albums